Peter Shere Lekgothoane (born 10 October 1979) is a South African professional footballer who last played as a left back for Moroka Swallows. He was born in Polokwane.

Career
Lekgothoane formerly played for AC Milan, Ria Stars, Jomo Cosmos, Mamelodi Sundowns and Mpumalanga Black Aces.

References

1979 births
Living people
People from Polokwane
Soccer players from Limpopo
South African soccer players
Ria Stars F.C. players
Jomo Cosmos F.C. players
Mamelodi Sundowns F.C. players
Mpumalanga Black Aces F.C. players
Moroka Swallows F.C. players
Association football defenders
South African Premier Division players